The following is a list of Limacodidae of Nepal. Fifty-seven different species are listed.

This list is primarily based on Colin Smith's 2010 "Lepidoptera of Nepal", which is based on Toshiro Haruta's "Moths of Nepal (Vol. 1-6)" with some recent additions and a modernized classification.

Altha subnotata
Althonarosa horisyaensis
Aphendala cana
Aphendala mechiensis
Atosia himalayana
Belippa horrida
Belippa ochreata
Belippa thoracica
Caissa gambita
Caissa medialis
Cania himalayana
Ceratonema retractata
Chalcoscelides castaneipars
Cheromettia apicata
Dactylorhynchides rufibasale
Dermonarosa rufotessellata
Euphlyctinides albifuscum
Hampsoniella marvelosa
Hyphorma minax
Mahanta quadrilinea
Miresa argentifera
Miresa bracteata
Miresa decedens
Monema coralina
Narosa conspersa
Nirmides cuprea
Nephelimorpha argentilinea
Parasa bicolor
Parasa gentilis
Parasa herbifera
Paraas hilaris
Paraas himalepida
Parasa latifascia
Parasa pastoralis
Parasa punica
Parasa repanda
Phlossa conjuncta
Phlossa crispa
Phlossa fasciata
Phocoderma velutina
Phrixolepia similis
Praesetora albitermina
Praesetora divergens
Prapata scotopepla
Scopelodes testacea
Scopelodes venosa
Scopelodes vulpina
Setora baibarana
Setora postornata
Squamosa ocellata
Susica himalayana
Susica pallida
Tetrapleba brevilinia
Thosea magna
Thosea sevastropuloi
Trichogyria circulifera
Triplophleps inferma

See also
List of butterflies of Nepal
Odonata of Nepal
Cerambycidae of Nepal
Zygaenidae of Nepal
Wildlife of Nepal

References

 01
Limacodidae
Insects of Nepal